Virginia Ruth Fuldner (née Duenkel; born March 7, 1947), also known as Ginny Fuldner, is an American former competition swimmer, Olympic champion, and former world record-holder.

At the 1964 Summer Olympics in Tokyo, Japan, Duenkel medaled in two individual swimming events as a 17-year-old.  First, she won the women's 400-meter freestyle.  Then she received a bronze medal in the women's 100-meter backstroke.

Duenkel was inducted into the International Swimming Hall of Fame as an "Honor Swimmer" in 1985.

The "Ginny Duenkel Municipal Pool", in her hometown of West Orange, New Jersey was named in her honor.  She attended West Orange High School, and then the University of Michigan.  The "Chris and Ginny Fuldner Aquatic Center" in Monett, Missouri is named in honor of Ginny and her husband and her contributions to the sport of swimming in Monett.

See also
 List of members of the International Swimming Hall of Fame
 List of Olympic medalists in swimming (women)
 List of University of Michigan sporting alumni

References

External links
 
 

Living people
1947 births
American female backstroke swimmers
American female freestyle swimmers
Olympic gold medalists for the United States in swimming
Pan American Games gold medalists for the United States
People from West Orange, New Jersey
Sportspeople from Essex County, New Jersey
West Orange High School (New Jersey) alumni
Swimmers at the 1963 Pan American Games
Swimmers at the 1964 Summer Olympics
University of Michigan alumni
Swimmers from New Jersey
Medalists at the 1964 Summer Olympics
Olympic bronze medalists for the United States in swimming
Pan American Games medalists in swimming
People from Monett, Missouri
Medalists at the 1963 Pan American Games
21st-century American women